Dr.Pappu Venugopala Rao (born 30 June 1948) is a well-known Indian educationist and renowned musicologist. He specializes in Telugu and Sanskrit literature. He is also a writer and has written on varied subjects such as Music, Culture and spiritual subjects.

Early life
Pappu as he is fondly known was born in Vizianagaram, Andhra Pradesh. He has post graduated in English, Telugu and Sanskrit Literature from M. R. College, Vizianagaram. He earned his doctorate in Telugu and Sanskrit.

Career
Pappu Venugopal Rao began his career as a Lecturer in Telugu at Mrs.AVN College, Visakhapatnam. Since 1980 he had been working with the American Institute of Indian Studies and retired as its Associate Director General for the Southern Indian region during 2008. He is presently the organisation's Consultant.

He is actively involved in research activities in Carnatic Music and Dance songs. He has delivered several lectures and presentations on the subject.

Dr.Pappu Venugopala Rao is also a book reviewer for the newspaper The Hindu and a contributing editor to Sruti Magazine.

Cultural
 Performed 'Ashtavadhanam' about twenty times in Telugu and Sanskrit languages.
 Delivered about 50 Lecture Demonstrations on various topics on Music & Kuchipudi Dance with Vempati Chinna Satyam in India and abroad.
 Delivered about 100 lectures on literature.

Dance Dramas

Controversy
On October 23 2017, Rao’s name figured on a list of ‘alleged sexual offenders from academia’ released online by US-based law student Raya Sarkar. She published 69 names, inviting criticism from some quarters on taking activism to levels of absurdity. 

On 17 November 2017, The secretary of Madras Music Academy, Pappu Venugopala Rao, resigned from his post. Ever since, there has been much speculation around his resignation — while some say it was an impending decision, some believe it has to do with the fact that his name appears on a list of sexual harassers and offenders from academia. 

Pappu Venugopal Rao however has denied all allegations against him.

Books published
12. Nritta Ratnavali book released in 2013 by Dr.Pappu Venugopala Rao & co authored by Dr. Yasoda.

Awards

 Dr.K.V.Rao & Dr.Jyoti Rao Award in association with Sri Raja-Lakshmi Foundation and the Telugu Fine Arts Society, New Jersey, USA.

Titles: 

 Aasukavi Sekhara conferred by Prof. S.V.Jogarao
 Kalavipanchi
 Sangeetha Saastra Visaarada
 Sangeeta Saastra Siromani
 Ashtavadhaana Sekhara

Reference list

Newspaper article links

External links
 Dr.Pappu Venugopala Rao's Official Website
 Flowers at his feet Website

Indian musicologists
Indian spiritual writers
Living people
1948 births
Musicians from Andhra Pradesh
People from Vizianagaram